Boko is a town in the Niangoloko Department of Comoé Province in south-western Burkina Faso. The town has a population of 2,633.

See also 
Boko District

References

Populated places in the Cascades Region
Comoé Province